Michael P. Johnson (born April 2, 1987) is a former American football offensive lineman. He played college football for the University of Alabama, and was recognized as a consensus All-American.  The Atlanta Falcons chose him in the third round of the 2010 NFL Draft.

Early years
Johnson was born in Pensacola, Florida.  He attended Pine Forest High School in Pensacola, where he achieved a perfect 4.0 GPA and scored a 27 on the ACT exam.  He played high school football for the Pine Forest Eagles.  Considered a four-star recruit by Rivals.com, Johnson was listed as the No. 17 offensive tackle prospect in the nation.

College career
Johnson attended the University of Alabama, where he played for coach Nick Saban's Alabama Crimson Tide football team from 2006 to 2009.  He earned first-team All-American honors from Pro Football Weekly in 2008.  The following year, Johnson was named a consensus first-team All-American and was a member of Alabama's first national championship team in 17 years.

Professional career
Johnson was drafted 98th overall in the third round of the 2010 NFL Draft by the Atlanta Falcons. On June 19, the Falcons signed Johnson to a deal. He played two games in 2011 spending most of the season on injured reserve. He played 16 games in 2012 as the second string guard and a blocking tight end on goal line/short yardage situations. Johnson, who went into the preseason as the projected starter at right tackle, suffered a fractured fibula and dislocated left ankle on August 6, 2013, and was placed on injured reserve three days later.

Johnson retired from the NFL before the 2015 season began and several months after being released from the Falcons.

References

External links
Alabama Crimson Tide bio

1987 births
Living people
Alabama Crimson Tide football players
All-American college football players
American football offensive guards
Atlanta Falcons players
Players of American football from Pensacola, Florida